Mskhlebi (literally "pears") is a highland village and community center in northern Georgia. It is located on the right bank of the river Greater Liakhvi in the Java Municipality, Shida Kartli region. Distance to the municipal center Java is 2 km. The village is bordered by Oak forests.

References 

Mskhlebi Community villages